It Only Hurts When I Laugh is a punchline of a joke which exists in numerous versions since at least 19th century.  A typical setup is that someone badly hurt (e.g., a  Wild West rancher with an arrow in his chest, a Jew crucified by the Nazis, etc.) is asked "Does it hurt?" — "I'm fine. It only hurts when I laugh."

The phrase was used as a title of various works:

 It Only Hurts When I Laugh (album)
 It Only Hurts When I Laugh (TV series)
 It Only Hurts When I Laugh, an autobiography by Stan Freberg
 Listy i rozmowy ("It Only Hurts When I Laugh... Letters and Conversations")' see Correspondence of Stanisław Lem

See also
Only When I Laugh (disambiguation)
"It Only Hurts When I'm Laughing", a song by Mi-Sex

References

English words and phrases
Jokes